Jaromír Šimůnek (born 2 February 1955) is a Czech former biathlete. He competed at the 1980 Winter Olympics, the 1984 Winter Olympics and the 1988 Winter Olympics.

References

External links
 

1955 births
Living people
Czech male biathletes
Olympic biathletes of Czechoslovakia
Biathletes at the 1980 Winter Olympics
Biathletes at the 1984 Winter Olympics
Biathletes at the 1988 Winter Olympics
People from Semily
Sportspeople from the Liberec Region